The Samoa national netball team or Tifa Moana represent Samoa in international netball tests and competitions. The team are coached by Marcia Hardcastle and are co-captained by Opheira Harder-Karatau and Julianna Naoupu. As of 21 July 2019, Samoa are 16th in the INF World Rankings.

History
They finished 12th at the 2011 World Netball Championships in Singapore, and 9th at the 2010 Commonwealth Games.

On their debut at the Nations Cup (netball) Samoa, captained by Sanita To’o, won the tournament with a final score of 50-41 against Singapore. Samoa participated in the 2009 edition of the Fast5 Netball World Series, placing 6th in the competition.

In 2022 they competed in the 2022 Oceania World Cup Qualifiers, but missed out on qualification.

Results and fixtures
The following is a list of recent and future matches.

Legend

2022

Players
Squad for 2023 Netball World Cup qualifiers

 
  
 

Source:

Notable former players 
 Rita Fatialofa-Paloto
 Cathrine Latu
 Sheryl Scanlan (née Clarke)
 Frances Solia
 Linda Vagana

Competitive history

See also

 Netball in Samoa
 Samoa national under-21 netball team

References

Netball in Samoa
National netball teams of Oceania
Netball